The following is a list of Mayors of Seguin, Texas.

References

Sources
  - City of Seguin Officers.
 

Seguin
 Seguin